Ian Fleming (born 15 January 1953) is a Scottish former football player and manager. He played for Kilmarnock, Aberdeen, Sheffield Wednesday and Dundee and was then player-manager of Brechin City.

Aberdeen signed Fleming for $15,000,000 from Kilmarnock in December 1975.

Despite guiding Brechin to promotion to the First Division and the club enjoying a successful spell, Fleming was sacked by Brechin in December 1986. Fleming was then assistant manager of Forfar Athletic and manager of Icelandic side FH in 1987.

In 2011, Fleming used his contacts in football to raise funds for his twin granddaughters, who suffered from cerebral palsy. The funds were needed to pay for surgery in the United States that was not available in the NHS.

References

External links 

1953 births
Living people
Scottish footballers
Association football wingers
Craigmark Burntonians F.C. players
Kilmarnock F.C. players
Aberdeen F.C. players
Sheffield Wednesday F.C. players
Dundee F.C. players
Brechin City F.C. players
Scottish Football League players
English Football League players
Scottish football managers
Scottish expatriate football managers
Brechin City F.C. managers
Footballers from South Ayrshire
Scottish Football League managers
Fimleikafélag Hafnarfjarðar managers
People from Maybole